Jayantha Ketagoda is a Sri Lankan actor and a member of the Parliament of Sri Lanka. He belongs to the Sri Lanka Podujana Peramuna.

References

Candidates in the 2019 Sri Lankan presidential election
Living people
Members of the 14th Parliament of Sri Lanka
Members of the 16th Parliament of Sri Lanka
Sinhalese politicians
Year of birth missing (living people)